The 2013 season will be the Atlanta Silverbacks's seventeenth season of existence, and their third consecutive season playing in the North American Soccer League, the second division of the American soccer pyramid.

Background 

The Atlanta Silverbacks' 2012 season was a tale of two halves. In their first 15 games they only managed 8 points, through 1 win, 5 draws and 9 losses. In their final 13 games they gather 22 points in 6 wins, 4 draws and 3 losses (a league best).

They had mixed results in U.S. Open Cup, winning their first match against fourth division opponent Georgia Revolution 1–0. Then losing to MLS side Seattle Sounders FC 5-1 a week later.

On May 2, 2012 first-year head coach Alex Pineda Chacón was replaced by interim head coach Eric Wynalda. Wynalda announced Brian Haynes would replace him as head coach.

Club

Roster

On loan

Technical Staff
  Brian Haynes – Head Coach
  José Pinho – Goalkeeper Coach
  Eric Wynalda – Technical Director

Competitions

Preseason 
 Source

Friendlies 
 Source

NASL

Spring season

Table

Results summary

Results by round

Match results

Fall season

Table

Results summary

Results by round

Match results

U.S. Open Cup

Playoffs

Statistics

Goals 
Includes all competitive matches. The list is sorted by shirt number when total goals are equal.
Last updated on June 18, 2013

Assists 
Includes all competitive matches. The list is sorted by shirt number when total assists are equal.
Last updated on February 14, 2013

Clean sheets 
Includes all competitive matches. The list is sorted by shirt number when total clean sheets are equal.
Last updated on June 18, 2013

Transfers

In

Out

Loan in

Loan out

See also 
 2013 in American soccer
 2013 North American Soccer League season
 Atlanta Silverbacks

References 

Atlanta Silverbacks seasons
Atlanta Silverbacks
Atlanta Silverbacks
Atlanta Silverbacks